Shmohawk or schmohawk is a slang term that might have derived from schmo, a slang term meaning fool. The HBO television show Curb Your Enthusiasm gave the word recent notoriety. Earlier uses of the word can be found in the Crusader Rabbit animated cartoon "Crusader and the Schmohawk Indians", released in 1950 and in Saul Bellow's 1958 novel Henderson the Rain King.

Shmohawk or schmohawk is the word mohawk with the prefix shm-. In English, this prefix has a mocking or dismissive meaning. The shm- prefix's English language meaning is borrowed from the Yiddish language, in which the prefix has been used to similar effect.

In popular culture
In the 1985 film Transylvania 6-5000, Jeff Goldblum's character calls Ed Begley, Jr.'s character a shmohawk after stating he didn't know Frankenstein was still alive.
In the Season 6 premiere of the HBO show Curb Your Enthusiasm entitled “Meet the Blacks”, Larry David, the main character, struggles through traffic while his wife Cheryl tries to impress upon her husband the scale of tragedy caused by a large hurricane. Larry yells out to another driver, "Hey dum dum. Go ahead. Move in," and this interaction reminds Larry that his father often used to call bad drivers "shmohawks." Larry continues to use the term in later episodes.

References

External links
 

Jewish comedy and humor
Slurs related to low intelligence